A cop killer is a person who kills a police officer.

Cop killer or Cop Killer may also refer to:

 "Cop Killer" (song), a 1992 song by American heavy metal band Body Count
 Cop Killer (novel), a novel by Sjöwall and Wahlöö
 Copkiller, a 1983 Italian film starring Harvey Keitel
 Cop Killer (TV film), a 1988 television film starring Joseph Bottoms
 Cop Killer (CSI: Miami), an episode of CSI: Miami
 "The Cop-Killer" (short story), a 1951 Nero Wolfe novella by Rex Stout
 The Police Murderer (Polismördaren), a 1994 Swedish film
 Cop killer bullets, a name sometimes given to Teflon-coated bullets

See also 
 Cop Killa, alternate name for the Vertebreaker piledriver, a professional wrestling driver move